Albert Johnston may refer to:

Albert Sidney Johnston (1803–1862), US Army officer, Texas Army general, and Confederate States general
Albert Johnson (soccer) (1880–1941), Canadian amateur
Albert Johnston (rugby league) (1892–1961), Australian rugby league footballer and coach
Albert C. Johnston (died 1988), American doctor

See also
 Albert Johnson (disambiguation)
 Albert Sidney Johnston (disambiguation)
 Bert Johnston (disambiguation)